The English Standard Version (ESV) is a translation of the Bible in contemporary English. Published in 2001 by Crossway, the ESV was "created by a team of more than 100 leading evangelical scholars and pastors." The ESV relies on recently published critical editions of the original Hebrew, Aramaic, and Greek texts.

Crossway claims that the ESV continues a legacy of precision and faithfulness in translating the original text into English. It describes the ESV as a translation that adheres to an "essentially literal" translation philosophy, taking into account "differences in grammar, syntax, and idiom between current literary English and the original languages." It also describes the ESV as a translation that "emphasizes 'word-for-word' accuracy, literary excellence, and depth of meaning."

Since its official publication, the ESV has received endorsement from numerous evangelical pastors and theologians, including John Piper, R. C. Sproul, and Kevin DeYoung. As of July 2015, over 100 million printed copies of the translation had been distributed. In 2021, this figure had increased to 250 million.

History

Pre-publication 
During the early 1990s, Crossway president Lane T. Dennis engaged in discussions with various Christian scholars and pastors regarding the need for a new literal translation of the Bible. In 1997, Dennis contacted the National Council of Churches (NCC) and proceeded to enter negotiations, alongside Trinity Evangelical Divinity School professor Wayne Grudem, to obtain rights to use the 1971 text edition of the Revised Standard Version (RSV) as the starting point for a new translation. In September 1998, an agreement was reached with the NCC for Crossway to use and modify the 1971 RSV text, thereby enabling the creation of a new translation. Crossway moved forward from this position by forming a translation committee and initiating work on the English Standard Version. Crossway officially published the ESV in 2001.

In 1999, World reported of "feminists" noticing links between Crossway and the Council on Biblical Manhood and Womanhood (CBMW). Members of the CBMW had earlier been involved in criticizing plans made by Zondervan's New International Version (NIV) translation committee to publish a gender-neutral edition of the NIV. Grudem, who was president of the CBMW at the time, responded by stating, "This [translation] is not a CBMW project."

Translation Oversight Committee 
Chaired by Dennis, the fourteen-member Translation Oversight Committee was aided by more than fifty biblical experts serving as review scholars. The translation committee also received input from the Advisory Council, having more than fifty members. J. I. Packer served as general editor of the translation. The translation committee features the following notable individuals:

 Dr. Wayne A. Grudem (Research Professor, Theology and Biblical Studies, Phoenix Seminary)
 Dr. R. Kent Hughes (Senior Pastor Emeritus, College Church in Wheaton)
 Dr. J. I. Packer (Board of Governors Professor of Theology, Regent College, Vancouver, Canada)
 Dr. Vern Sheridan Poythress (Professor of New Testament Interpretation, Westminster Theological Seminary; Editor, Westminster Theological Journal)
 Dr. Gordon Wenham (Old Testament Tutor at Trinity College, Bristol; Emeritus Professor of Old Testament, University of Gloucestershire)

Post-publication 
In 2008, Crossway published the ESV Study Bible, which would go on to sell over 1 million copies. In 2009, the Evangelical Christian Publishers Association named the ESV Study Bible as Christian Book of the Year. This was the first time in the award's 30-year history to be given to a study Bible.

Debate surrounding translation philosophy 
At the 2008 annual meeting of the Evangelical Theological Society, Mark L. Strauss presented a paper titled "Why the English Standard Version should not become the Standard English Version: How to make a good translation much better." In the paper, Strauss criticizes the ESV for using dated language, among other perceived issues, such as using gender-neutral language inconsistently in translation. ESV translator William D. Mounce responded to Strauss's criticism:

Strauss invited Mounce to engage further through participation at the following annual meeting. In 2009, Mounce presented his formal response paper titled "Can the ESV and TNIV Co-Exist in the Same Universe?" In the paper, Mounce describes various points regarding his view of the need for both formal and functional translations.

In October 2019, University of Oklahoma Sociology Associate Professor Samuel L. Perry published a journal article titled "The Bible as a Product of Cultural Power: The Case of Gender Ideology in the English Standard Version." In the article, Perry attempts to demonstrate "how a more critical approach toward 'the Bible' can provide richer, more sophisticated sociological analyses of power and cultural reproduction within Christian traditions." Perry argues that Crossway's ESV translation committee made "intentional, systematic changes" into the ESV for the purpose of being able to "publish and mass-market a text more amenable to conservative, complementarian interpretations." Perry further argues that the ESV translation committee "have engaged in more covert means of cultural reproduction, not only disseminating their interpretation of the biblical text, but manipulating the text itself." The ESV Study Bible often details in its study notes why a complementarian interpretation of the original text may have been rendered in translation.

In 2020, the Ireland-based Association of Catholic Priests criticized the ESV for its position on the use of gender-neutral language, perceiving the use of terms such as "mankind" and "brothers" to be "not just out of sync with modern usage but are culturally regarded as diminishing and disrespectful of women."

In June 2021, Samuel L. Perry published a journal article titled "Whitewashing Evangelical Scripture: The Case of Slavery and Antisemitism in the English Standard Version." In the article, Perry attempts to demonstrate how "the ESV editors, while modifying certain RSV renderings to establish transitivity for their text among complementarian/biblicist Christians, sought to establish intransitivity between the text and more pejorative social interpretations by progressively re-translating lexically ambiguous terms and introducing footnotes to obviate the Bible’s ostensible promotion of slavery and antisemitism." In turn, Perry was interviewed by Salon regarding the content of the article. Boyce College Professor of Biblical Studies Denny Burk points out that Perry makes a "significant error" in referring to Grudem as the general editor of the ESV. In July 2021, Bible Study Magazine editor Mark Ward published an article to his personal blog in response:

Literary attributes

Relationship to the Revised Standard Version 
The ESV is derived from the 1971 text edition of the Revised Standard Version. ESV translation committee member Wayne Grudem claims that approximately eight percent (or about 60,000 words) of the 1971 RSV text being used for the ESV was revised as of first publication in 2001. Grudem states that the committee removed "every trace of liberal influence that had caused such criticism from evangelicals when the RSV was first published in 1952." Although, Grudem also states that much of the 1971 RSV text left unchanged by the committee "is simply 'the best of the best' of the KJV tradition."

Style 
Theologian Tim Challies has praised the ESV for its commitment to literary excellence:

Crossway claims that the ESV "retains theological terminology—words such as grace, faith, justification, sanctification, redemption, regeneration, reconciliation, propitiation—because of their central importance for Christian doctrine and also because the underlying Greek words were already becoming key words and technical terms among Christians in New Testament times." It also claims that the ESV lets the distinct writing styles of the various biblical writers come through the translated text.

Position on gender-neutral language 
The ESV translation committee states that "the goal of the ESV is to render literally what is in the original." The committee expands on this position in claiming that, although the ESV avoids using gender-neutral language (for the purpose of preserving contextual meaning found in the original text), the translation does utilize gender-neutral language in specific cases. The committee further state that their objective was "transparency to the original text, allowing the reader to understand the original on its own terms rather than in the terms of our present-day Western culture."

Revisions and other editions

2007 text edition 
Crossway published the first revision of the ESV text in 2007 as "ESV Text Edition: 2007." The revision makes minor changes to the 2001 text.

Oxford Apocrypha edition 
In 2009, Oxford University Press published the English Standard Version Bible with Apocrypha. This edition includes the Apocrypha, placed at the back of the Bible, intended for "denominations that use those books in liturgical readings and for students who need them for historical purposes."

2011 text edition 
Crossway published the second revision of the ESV text in 2011 as "ESV Text Edition: 2011." The revision changes fewer than 500 words in total throughout 275 verses from the 2007 text. The changes were made in each case to "correct grammar, improve consistency, or increase precision in meaning." A notable revision was made in Isaiah 53:5, changing "wounded for our transgressions" to "pierced for our transgressions" in the revised text.

Gideons edition 
In 2013, Gideons International permanently transitioned from the New King James Version to the ESV as their translation of choice for free of charge distribution Bibles. In addition to being granted licensing for the ESV text (for the purpose of distribution), Crossway gave Gideons International permission to modify the text to use alternative readings based on the Textus Receptus. The Gideons edition uses more than 50 alternative readings.

2016 text edition 
Crossway published the third revision of the ESV text in 2016 as the "ESV Permanent Text Edition (2016)." The revision changes 52 words in total throughout 29 verses from the 2011 text. A notable revision was made in Genesis 3:16 to use a complementarian interpretation of the original text: switching "shall be toward" with "shall be contrary to" in the revised text. The previous rendering can be found in the footnotes (excluding any editions that specifically do not have footnotes, such as the ESV Reader's Bible). The ESV Study Bible details in its study notes the revised interpretation in relation to a parallel understanding of 3:16 with both 4:7 (which shares the Hebrew word teshuqah; this verse having also been updated in the 2016 text) and Ephesians 5:21–32.

Coinciding with the release of the revision, Crossway announced that "the text of the ESV Bible will remain unchanged in all future editions printed and published by Crossway." However, in a statement from Lane T. Dennis the following month, the new policy was abandoned "to allow for ongoing periodic updating of the text to reflect the realities of biblical scholarship such as textual discoveries or changes in English over time." In the statement, Dennis responded to public discourse surrounding the policy: "We have become convinced that this decision was a mistake. We apologize for this and for any concern this has caused for readers of the ESV." The revision was subsequently republished as "ESV Text Edition: 2016."

Catholic edition 
In 2018, the Conference of Catholic Bishops of India published the ESV Catholic Edition Bible (ESV-CE), which includes the deuterocanonical books in Catholic canonical order. With permission from Crossway, a team of Catholic scholars reviewed the text of the ESV in light of the Vatican's translation principles as set forth in Liturgiam authenticam, making approved modifications where needed to adhere to Catholic teaching.

In 2019, the Augustine Institute published the ESV-CE in North America as the Augustine Bible. In October 2021, following these developments, the Society for Promoting Christian Knowledge published its own version of the ESV-CE, newly typeset and with anglicized spelling, in multiple formats.

Anglican edition 
In 2019, Anglican Liturgy Press published the ESV with Apocrypha. This edition includes the Apocrypha, placed at the back of the Bible. Having been approved by the ESV translation committee, the Apocrypha text found in this edition is a minor revision of the 2009 text published by Oxford University Press. A notable revision was made in retranslating the Book of Tobit.

Use

Study Bibles 
The ESV has been used as the Bible text for a number of study Bible editions, including but not limited to:

 ESV study Bibles published by Crossway: the ESV Study Bible, the ESV Global Study Bible, the ESV Student Study Bible, and the ESV Literary Study Bible
 The MacArthur Study Bible, published by Thomas Nelson
 The Lutheran Study Bible, published by Concordia Publishing House
 The Reformation Study Bible, published by Ligonier Ministries
 The Fire Bible, published by Hendrickson Publishers
 The Apocrypha: The Lutheran Edition with Notes, published by Concordia Publishing House
 The Scofield Study Bible III, published by Oxford University Press
 The Ryrie Study Bible, published by Moody Publishers

Liturgical 
In August 2006, the Lutheran Church–Missouri Synod released the Lutheran Service Book (LSB), which uses the ESV as its primary Bible text. With permission from Crossway, the LSB occasionally uses an alternative reading of the ESV in accordance with its original translation principles.

In April 2020, the Catholic Church in India started using a new English lectionary which uses the ESV-CE as its Bible text (excluding the book of Psalms, which uses the Grail Psalms translation instead).

In July 2020, the Bishops' Conference of Scotland approved the preparation of a new lectionary based on the ESV-CE. The Catholic Bishops' Conference of England and Wales also approved their own lectionary to be based on the ESV-CE.

See also 
 Modern English Bible translations

Notes

References

Further reading 
 Borland, James A. (November 18, 2003). "The English Standard Version - A Review Article". SOR Faculty Publications and Presentations. 162.
 Köstenberger, Andreas J.; Croteau, David A., eds. (2012). Which Bible Translation Should I Use?: A Comparison of 4 Major Recent Versions. Nashville, TN: B&H Publishing Group. .
 Poythress, Vern S.; Grudem, Wayne A. (2004). The TNIV and the Gender-Neutral Bible Controversy. Nashville, TN: Broadman and Holman Publishers. .
 Ryken, Leland (2011). The ESV and the English Bible Legacy. Wheaton, IL: Crossway. .
 Schmid, Michael T. (2016). Translating the Bible Literally: The history and translation methods of the King James Version, the New American Standard Bible and the English Standard Version. Bloomington, IN: WestBow Press. .

External links 
 

2001 books
2001 in Christianity
Bible translations into English